960H is a resolution used in analog CCTV equipment. 960H represents the number of horizontal pixels in a video signal transmitted from a camera or received by a DVR (Digital Video Recorder). The resolution of 960H depends on whether the equipment is PAL or NTSC based: 960H represents 960 x 576 (PAL) or 960 x 480 (NTSC) pixels. 960H represents an increase in pixels of some 30% over standard D1 resolution, which is 720 x 576 pixels (PAL), or 720 x 480 pixels (NTSC). The increased resolution over D1 comes as a result of a longer horizontal scan. The difference is that whilst D1 has a 4:3 aspect ratio 960H has a 16:9 widescreen aspect ratio. The extra pixels are used to form the increased area to the sides of the D1 image. The pixel density of 960H is identical to standard D1 resolution so it does not give any improvement in image quality, merely a wider aspect ratio.

Alternative analog video transport technologies carrying higher resolutions than 960H include HD-TVI, HDCVI, and AHD.

References 

Image sensors